Brentiscerus is a genus of dirt-colored seed bugs in the family Rhyparochromidae. There are at least two described species in Brentiscerus, found in Australia and New Zealand.

Species
These two species belong to the genus Brentiscerus:
 Brentiscerus obscurus Gross, 1965
 Brentiscerus putoni (White, 1878)

References

External links

 

Drymini